248 (two hundred [and] forty-eight) is the natural number following 247 and preceding 249.

Additionally, 248 is:
a nontotient.
a refactorable number.
an untouchable number.
palindromic in bases 13 (16113), 30 (8830), 61 (4461) and 123 (22123).
a Harshad number in bases 3, 4, 6, 7, 9, 11, 13 (and 18 other bases).
part of the 43-aliquot tree. The aliquot sequence starting at 248 is: 248, 232, 218, 112, 136, 134, 70, 74, 40, 50, 43, 1, 0.

The exceptional Lie group E8 has dimension 248.

References

Integers